Officer South is a suburb and rural locality in Melbourne, Victoria, Australia,  south-east of Melbourne's Central Business District, located within the Shire of Cardinia local government area. Officer South recorded a population of 1,159 at the 2021 census.

History

Officer South is situated in the Kulin nation traditional Aboriginal country. The Boon Wurrung people are local custodians within the Kulin nation.

The origin of the suburb name is from the name of the Officer family who had lived in the area, and the geographic location south of the main Officer settlement.

References

Suburbs of the Shire of Cardinia